Antonio Ungar (born 1974) is a Colombian writer. 

He has published several collections of short stories and novels. His latest novel "Three White Coffins" relates a fictitious political intrigue, and mixes a large amount of factual political events with a fictional hero-antihero character. The main political characters of the novel mirror real recent political leaders of Colombia, suspected of close connections to paramilitary groups.

Short stories
 Trece Circos y otros cuentos comunes (Thirteen circuses and other common tales)

Novels

 Zanahorias voladoras (Flying Carrots), 
 Las orejas del lobo (The Ears of the Wolf; shortlisted for the Courier International Prize) 
 Tres ataúdes blancos (Three White Coffins; winner of the Premio Herralde); short listed for the Rómulo Gallegos Prize, currently being adapted into a TV series; translated into French, English, Dutch, German, Italian, Greek and Hebrew.

References

Colombian male writers
1974 births
Living people
People from Bogotá